Borzynowo may refer to the following places in Poland:
Borzynowo, Lower Silesian Voivodeship (south-west Poland)
Borzynowo, Warmian-Masurian Voivodeship (north Poland)